The Sunday Times Rich List 2010 was published on 25 April 2010.

Since 1989 the UK national Sunday newspaper The Sunday Times (sister paper to The Times) has published an annual magazine supplement to the newspaper called the Sunday Times Rich List. The list is based on an estimate of the minimum wealth of the richest 1,000 people or families in the United Kingdom as of January of that year, and is compiled by Dr Philip Beresford. A separate section lists the 250 richest Irish, including both Northern Ireland and the Republic of Ireland.

As in previous years, the Rich List was widely previewed in the UK media and extensively covered on the day of its publication. The top four places in the Rich List were unchanged from the previous year. 

Among the most notable changes were a rise in the collective wealth of the Rich List by almost a third over the previous year — the largest annual increase in the 22 years that the Sunday Times has run the List.

Notable changes in rankings include the gains for David and Simon Reuben, up to fifth place at 5.53 billion, and for Alisher Usmanov, up to sixth place at £4.7 billion. There were two new entries in the top 20, Joseph Lau, a Chinese property tycoon and Leonard Blavatnik, a Russian oligarch, returning after removal from the previous year's list.

Top 12 fortunes

See also
Lists of billionaires

References

External links
 Sunday Times Rich List Times Online

Sunday Times Rich List
2010 in the United Kingdom